Ruby was a railway station on the South Gippsland line in South Gippsland, Victoria. The station was opened during the 1890s and operated until the 1970s, after which the station building and platform were dismantled and levelled, and all sidings within the yard removed.

There is some evidence, however, of the former station at the site, including the former yards area (now used to store disused refrigerators and other white-goods), and flowering plants typically found at station sites now growing wild in the proximity including hydrangeas and roses.

Images of rail vehicles and trains passing through and stopped at the former Ruby Station are displayed at Korumburra railway station.

The SGR had plans to reconstruct a platform at the former station location. This would have provided additional stops for visitors and provide also for short shuttles train runs from either Leongatha or Korumburra. Additional benefits would have been for visitors to the region to experience additional towns and districts along the South Gippsland Line.

Disused railway stations in Victoria (Australia)
Transport in Gippsland (region)
Shire of South Gippsland